Budczyce  is a village in the administrative district of Gmina Zawonia in Trzebnica County, Lower Silesian Voivodeship in southwestern Poland.

References

Budczyce